"Hello" is a song by American rapper Pop Smoke featuring fellow American rapper A Boogie wit da Hoodie, from the deluxe edition of the former's posthumous debut studio album, Shoot for the Stars, Aim for the Moon (2020) as well as the EP For The Night (2020). It was written by the two artists alongside Steven Victor, Jason Avalos, and the song's producers, CashMoneyAP and Rico Beats. "Hello" was released as the sixth single from the album on February 9, 2021, by Victor Victor Worldwide and Republic Records.

The song features a piano, strings, and drum instrumentation. In the lyrics, Pop Smoke references basketball player Manu Ginóbili and A Boogie wit da Hoodie declares himself the king of New York City while stating that Pop Smoke would also hold that title if he were still alive. It peaked at number 83 on the US Billboard Hot 100 while reaching the top-40 of charts in Greece and Canada. The song was certified platinum in the United States by the Recording Industry Association of America (RIAA).

Background and release
Pop Smoke's manager Steven Victor first announced on July 8, 2020, through his Twitter account that a song with A Boogie wit da Hoodie was coming out. "Hello" was released on the deluxe edition of the Pop Smoke's posthumous debut studio album, Shoot for the Stars, Aim for the Moon (2020), as the thirtieth track on July 20, 2020. The song was later serviced to US rhythmic contemporary radio as the sixth single from the album on February 9, 2021, by Victor Victor Worldwide and Republic Records. The song was written by Pop Smoke and A Boogie wit da Hoodie, who are credited under their legal names of Bashar Jackson and Julius Dubose, alongside Victor, Jason Avalos, Alex Petit and Ricardo Lamarre. The track was produced by the latter two, respectively known as CashMoneyAP and Rico Beats.

Composition and reception
According to Mitch Findlay of HotNewHipHop, the production of "Hello" consists of an "oppressive drumline, juxtaposed beautifully over an emotional blend of piano and string". Pop Smoke references basketball player Manu Ginóbili, who played for the San Antonio Spurs, in the songs lyrics rapping: "I like my bitches redbone, ass fat, jello, Lightskin, yellow, iced out, hello, I'm the king of New York, Melo, Black hair by the regis and pelloAsk around, niggas know me, I'm in Europe with Ginobli." A Boogie wit da Hoodie declares himself the king of New York City while saying he would have shared the title with Pop Smoke if he were still alive.

Findlay opined that it is "surprising they didn't put this one on the original album, as it's easily one of the best songs we've seen from both projects". Pandora named "Hello" one of the most "liked" songs of mid-late 2020. In an interview with The Source, English actor Damson Idris explained why he loved the song: I was in [Los Angeles], and I went and in a got loud car, I never do that. I got a G-Wagon and the song was playing. Someone got in my car and played it and my shoulders just couldn't stop. Then I saw the video and I just saw the energy that he had when he performed that song. And, you know, in dedication to him, I wanted it to be on my top 50 Spotify. Bobby Shmurda shared a video of himself listening to "Hello" after serving six years in prison.

Commercial performance
"Hello" initially charted and peaked at number one on the US Bubbling Under Hot 100 Singles chart, spending a milestone 24 weeks on the chart. The song later entered the US Billboard Hot 100, peaking at number 83, while reaching number 32 on the US Hot R&B/Hip-Hop Songs and number two on the Rhythmic charts. The Recording Industry Association of America (RIAA) certified the single a platinum certification, which denotes one million units based on sales and track-equivalent on-demand streams. The song further charted at number 14 in Greece, number 31 on the Canadian Hot 100, number 53 in Switzerland, number 87 in Germany, number 73 in Austria, number 76 in Ireland, number 98 in Portugal.

Credits and personnel
Credits adapted from Tidal.

 Pop Smoke vocals, songwriter
 A Boogie wit da Hoodie vocals, songwriter
 CashMoneyAP production, programming, songwriter
 Rico Beats production, programming, songwriter
 Steven Victor songwriter
 L3gion additional production, programming, songwriter
 Jess Jackson mastering engineer, mixing engineer
 Alex Estevez recording engineer
 Nate Alford recording engineer
 Rose Adams assistant mixing engineer
 Sage Skolfield assistant mixing engineer
 Sean Solymar assistant mixing engineer

Charts

Weekly charts

Year-end charts

Certifications

References

2021 singles
2021 songs
Pop Smoke songs
A Boogie wit da Hoodie songs
Songs written by Pop Smoke
Songs written by A Boogie wit da Hoodie
Republic Records singles
Songs written by CashMoneyAP